The Cousin from Nowhere is a 1934 German operetta film directed by Georg Zoch and starring Lien Deyers, Lizzi Holzschuh and Walter von Lennep. It is based on the 1921 operetta The Cousin from Nowhere composed by Eduard Künneke. It was later turned into a 1953 film of the same title.

Plot 
In this operetta adaptation, a young woman waits for her lover in India, while her impatient uncle wants to marry her off without further ado to a rich merchant.

Cast
Lien Deyers as Julia
Lizzi Holzschuh as Hannchen
Walter von Lennep as Hans
Rudolf Platte as August
Paul Heidemann as Wildenhagen
Jakob Tiedtke as Onkel Emil
Werner Finck as Der Diener Franz
Hilde Hofer-Pittschau as Die Tante
Ernst Behmer
Max Wilmsen
Luise Morland
Otto Sauter-Sarto
Curt Max Richter
Hans Steinberg
Eleonore Tappert

References

External links

German musical films
1934 musical films
Operetta films
Films based on operettas
Films directed by Georg Zoch
Films of Nazi Germany
Tobis Film films
German black-and-white films
Films scored by Eduard Künneke
1930s German films